AmericanEP is an extended play by English electronica duo The Chemical Brothers, released in 2002 following the release of their successful fourth studio album Come with Us.

Track listing 
 "Star Guitar (Trisco La Funk dub)" – 7:06 (Rowlands, Simons)
 "H.I.A." – 7:14 (Rowlands, Simons, Heard, Owens)
 "Come with Us (H Foundation remix)" – 8:17 (Rowlands, Simons, Rallo, Cooperman, Krissen, Fairstein)
 "Electronic Battle Weapon 6" – 9:03 (Rowlands, Simons)
 "Temptation/Star Guitar (live from Brixton Academy)" – 8:57 (Hook, Morris, Sumner, Gilbert, Rowlands, Simons)
 "Star Guitar"  – 4:01
 "The Test"  – 4:39

Come with Us/Japan Only EP

Come with Us/Japan Only EP is the  Japanese EP from The Chemical Brothers 2002 album Come with Us. This album is very similar to AmericanEP, except that it has two different songs and different videos.

Track listing 
 "Come With Us (radio edit)" – 3:40 
 "Star Guitar (Trisco La Funk dub)" – 7:06
 "H.I.A." – 7:10
 "Come With Us (H Foundation remix)" – 8:09
 "Temptation/Star Guitar (live from Brixton Academy)" – 8:55
 "Let Forever Be (video)"

References

External links 

 AllMusic article on the album

2002 EPs
The Chemical Brothers EPs
Astralwerks EPs
Virgin Records EPs